Anatoly Ivanov (born 8 January 1950) is a Russian rower. He competed in the men's eight event at the 1976 Summer Olympics.

References

External links
 

1950 births
Living people
Russian male rowers
Olympic rowers of the Soviet Union
Rowers at the 1976 Summer Olympics
Rowers from Saint Petersburg